Freya Lim (born 20 November 1979), also known as Freya Lin, is a Malaysian Mandopop singer and radio deejay based in Taiwan. She is a Taiwanese PR. Her father is a Chinese Malaysian and her mother is a Taiwanese.

In 2002, Lim graduated from University of Washington Seattle majoring in Psychology. After the release of her third album Freya's Love Songs (非愛不可。心林凡) in 2007, Lim went to Boston University to pursue a master's degree in Applied Communication.

Career
In 1999, Lim's singing talent was discovered by Taiwan well-known music producer Benjamin Lin Ming Yang. She was singing acclaimed Mandopop singer Sandy Lam's Night's Too Dark at a KTV with her friends when Benjamin Lin chanced upon her voice, and she was signed on to What's Music International Incorporated.

In 2000, Lim released her debut music album titled Freya (林凡同名專輯). The first single from the album was a new rendition of Sandy Lam's classic hit Night's Too Dark. Other singles from the album include Anything Can Be Forgotten  (什麼都可以忘記) and Goodbye Seattle  (再見西雅圖). However, Living Alone  (一個人生活) was the more popular song from Freya, as it was also the ending theme song of TV series The Beauty Mermaid  (天地傳說之魚美人), the song has a Mandarin and Cantonese cover version My Feelings  (感應) sung by Hong Kong singer Vincy Chan. The album Freya achieved an astounding sales record of 120,000 copies in Taiwan, and occupied Taiwan music charts for more than six months.

Lim was nominated Best New Artist in 2001 Golden Melody Awards with Freya  (林凡同名專輯) and won Best Newcomer (Bronze) in 2001 Singapore Hit Awards with the same album.

She was involved in the musical play Love Mileage (愛情里程) which was staged at Taiwan Huashan Arts Centre between 10 and 13 September 2009.

On top of being an actress and singer, she is also working as a Radio DJ in BCC.

Lim held her first ticketed solo concert 林凡 Freya&Friends 幸福零缺口犀利演唱會 at Taipei International Convention Center (TICC) on 18 August 2012.

Discography

Studio albums

Singles

Awards and nominations

Concerts

Solo Concerts

Joint Concerts

Radio
Taiwan i-radio FM96 i-have fun (Weekdays UTC+08:00 16:00–18:00)

Theatre
 Musical play Love Mileage (愛情里程) (staged at Taiwan Huashan Arts Centre from 10–13 September 2009)

References

External links

Freya Lim Sina Weibo
Freya Lim Official Facebook Page
Freya Lim Fan Club Facebook Page
Freya Lim Google+ Page

1979 births
Living people
Taiwanese people of Malaysian descent
Malaysian expatriates in Taiwan
Musicians from Taipei
21st-century Malaysian women singers
People from Penang
21st-century Taiwanese women singers